Brisaster antarcticus is a species of sea urchins of the family Schizasteridae. Their armour is covered with spines. Brisaster antarcticus was first scientifically described in 1906 by Döderlein.

References 

antarcticus